Maria Idalia Zapata (born 1946) is a Colombian chess player.

Biography
In the 1970s, Maria Idalia Zapata was one of Colombia's leading female chess players. In 1975, in Caracas she participated in Women's World Chess Championships Central American Zonal tournament and ranked in 5th place.

Maria Idalia Zapata played for Colombia and Colombia-2 teams in the Women's Chess Olympiads:
 In 1974, at second board in the 6th Chess Olympiad (women) in Medellín (+2, =0, -1),
 In 1976, at third board in the 7th Chess Olympiad (women) in Haifa (+3, =3, -3),
 In 1978, at first reserve board in the 8th Chess Olympiad (women) in Buenos Aires (+1, =1, -3).

References

External links
 
 
 

1946 births
Living people
Colombian female chess players
Chess Olympiad competitors
20th-century chess players
20th-century Colombian women